Frits Schutte (3 September 1897 – 4 January 1986) was a Dutch swimmer. He competed in the men's 4 × 200 metre freestyle relay event at the 1924 Summer Olympics.

References

External links
 

1897 births
1986 deaths
Olympic swimmers of the Netherlands
Swimmers at the 1924 Summer Olympics
Swimmers from Amsterdam
Dutch male freestyle swimmers
19th-century Dutch people
20th-century Dutch people